A hybrid word or hybridism is a word that etymologically derives from at least two languages.

Common hybrids
The most common form of hybrid word in English combines Latin and Greek parts. Since many prefixes and suffixes in English are of Latin or Greek etymology, it is straightforward to add a prefix or suffix from one language to an English word that comes from a different language, thus creating a hybrid word.

Hybridisms were formerly often considered to be barbarisms.

English examples 
 Antacid – from Greek  'against' and Latin acidus 'acid'; this term dates back to 1732.
Aquaphobia – from Latin  'water' and Greek  'fear'; this term is distinguished from the non-hybrid word hydrophobia, which can refer to symptoms of rabies.
 Asexual – from Greek prefix  'without' and the Latin  'sex'
 Automobile – a wheeled passenger vehicle, from Greek  'self' and Latin  'moveable'
 Beatnik – a 1950s counterculture movement centered on jazz music, coffeehouses, marijuana, and a literary movement, from English 'beat' and Russian  'one who does'. The term was coined in 1958 by San Francisco newspaper columnist Herb Caen.
 Biathlon – from the Latin  'twice' and the Greek  'contest'; the non-hybrid word is diathlon
 Bigamy – from Latin  'twice' and Greek  'wedlock'; this term dates back to the 13th century.
 Bigram – from Latin  'twice' and Greek ; the non-hybrid word is digram
 Bioluminescence – from the Greek  'life' and the Latin  'light'
 Campanology – from Latin  'bell' and Greek  'the study of'
 Chiral – from Greek  'hand' and Latin adjectival suffix . The term was coined in 1894.
 Chloroform – from Greek  'pale green' (indicating chlorine here) and Latin  'ant' (indicating formic acid here). The term first appeared in 1830s.
 Claustrophobia – from the Latin  'confined space' and Greek  'fear'. This term was coined in 1879.
 Democide – from the Greek  'people' and the Latin  '-killer'
 Divalent – from Greek  'two' and Latin  'strong'; the non-hybrid word is bivalent
 Dysfunction – from the Greek  'bad' and the Latin 
 Eigenvalue–  and English of French origin 'value'.
 Electrocution – a portmanteau of electricity, from the Greek , 'amber', and execution, from the Latin , 'follow out'
 Eusociality – from the Greek  'good' and the Latin 
 Genocide – From the Greek  'race, people' and the Latin  'to kill'
 Heteronormative – from Greek  'different' or 'other' and Latin  (via French ) 'norm'
Heterosexual – from Greek  'different' or 'other' and Latin  'sex'
 Hexadecimal – from Greek , 'six', and Latin  'tenth'; the non-hybrid word is sedecimal, from Latin 
 Hexavalent – from Greek , 'six', and Latin , 'strong'
 Homosexual – from the Greek  'same' and the Latin  'sex' (This example is remarked on in Tom Stoppard's The Invention of Love, with A. E. Housman's character saying "Homosexuals? Who is responsible for this barbarity?... It's half Greek and half Latin!".)
 Hyperactive – from Greek  'over' and Latin 
 Hypercomplex – from Greek  'over' and Latin  'an embrace'
 Hypercorrection – from Greek  'over' and Latin 
 Hyperextension – from Greek  'over' and Latin  'stretching out'; the non-hybrid word is superextension
 Hypervisor – from the Greek  'over' and the Latin  'seer'. This word is distinguished from the non-hybrid word supervisor, which is software that manages multiple user programs; a hypervisor is software that manages multiple virtual machines
 Liposuction – from the Greek  'fat' and the Latin  'sucking'
 Macroinstruction – from the Greek  'long' and the Latin 
 Mattergy – from the Latin  ('material') and the Greek  'energy': a "word for interchangeable matter and energy" Adjectival form:  "matergetic".
 Mega-annum – from the Greek  'large', and the Latin  'year'
 Meritocracy – From the Latin  'deserved' and the Greek  'government'
 Metadata – from the Greek  and the Latin  'given' from 
 Microinstruction – from the Greek  'small' and the Latin 
 Microvitum – from the Greek  'small' and the pseudo-Latin , from  'life'
 Minneapolis – from the Dakota  'water' and the Greek  'city'
 Monoculture – from the Greek  'one, single' and the Latin 
 Monolingual – from the Greek  'only' and the Latin  'tongue'; the non-hybrid word is unilingual
 Multigraph – from the Latin  'many' and the Greek ; the non-hybrid word would be polygraph, but that is generally used with a different meaning
 Neonate – from the Greek , 'new', and the Latin  'birth'
 Neuroscience – from the Greek  'sinew', and the Latin , from  'having knowledge'
 Neurotransmitter – from the Greek  'sinew', and the Latin  'across' and  'to send'
 Nonagon – from the Latin  'ninth' and the Greek  'angle'; the non-hybrid word is enneagon
 Oleomargarine – from the Latin  'beef fat' and the Greek  'pearl-like'
 Pandeism – from the Greek  'all' and Latin  'god'; compare with the non-hybrid word pantheism
 Periglacial – from the Greek  and the Latin 
Petroleum – from the Greek  'rock', and the Latin  'oil'
 Polyamory – from the Greek  'many' and the Latin  'love'
 Polydeism – from the Greek  'many' and the Latin  'god'; compare with the non-hybrid word polytheism
 Quadraphonic – from the Latin  meaning four and the Greek , from  meaning sound; the non-hybrid word is tetraphonic
 Quadriplegia – from the Latin  'four' and the Greek  'stroke', from  'to strike'; the non-hybrid word is tetraplegia
 Sociology – from the Latin , 'comrade', and the Greek  'word', 'reason', 'discourse'
 Television – from the Greek  'far' and the Latin  'seeing', from  'to see'
 Tonsillectomy – from the Latin  'tonsils' and the Greek , 'to cut out'
 Vexillology – from the Latin word , 'flag', and the Greek suffix , 'study'

Other languages

Modern Hebrew 
Modern Hebrew abounds with non-Semitic derivational affixes, which are applied to words of both Semitic and non-Semitic descent. The following hybrid words consist of a Hebrew-descent word and a non-Semitic descent suffix:

bitkhon-íst 'one who evaluates everything from the perspective of national security', from bitakhón 'security' + the productive internationalism -ist
khamúda-le 'cutie (feminine singular)', from khamuda 'cute (feminine singular) + -le, endearment diminutive of Yiddish origin
kiso-lógya 'the art of finding a political seat (especially in the Israeli Parliament)', from kisé 'seat' + the productive internationalism -lógya '-logy'
maarav-izátsya 'westernization', from maaráv 'west' + the productive internationalism -izátsya '-ization' (itself via Russian from a hybrid of Greek -ιζ- -iz- and Latin -atio)
miluím-nik 'reservist, reserve soldier', from miluím 'reserve' (literally 'fill-ins') + -nik, a most productive agent suffix of Yiddish and Russian descent

The following Modern Hebrew hybrid words have an international prefix:
anti-hitnatkút 'anti-disengagement'
post-milkhamtí 'post-war'
pro-araví 'pro-Arab'

Some hybrid words consist of both a non-Hebrew word and a non-Hebrew suffix of different origins:
shababnik 'rebel youth of Haredi Judaism', from Arabic shabab (youth) and -nik of Yiddish and Russian descent

Modern Hebrew also has a productive derogatory prefixal shm-, which results in an 'echoic expressive'. For example, um shmum, literally 'United Nations shm-United Nations', was a pejorative description by Israel's first Prime Minister, David Ben-Gurion, of the United Nations, called in Modern Hebrew umot meukhadot and abbreviated um. Thus, when a Hebrew speaker would like to express his impatience with or disdain for philosophy, s/he can say filosófya-shmilosófya. Modern Hebrew shm- is traceable back to Yiddish, and is found in English as well as shm-reduplication. This is comparable to the Turkic initial m-segment conveying a sense of 'and so on' as in Turkish dergi mergi okumuyor, literally 'magazine "shmagazine" read:NEGATIVE:PRESENT:3rd.person.singular', i.e. '(He) doesn't read magazine, journals or anything like that'.

Filipino
In Filipino, hybrid words are called siyokoy (literally "merman"). For example, concernado ("concerned"): "concern-" is from English and "-ado" is from Spanish.

Japanese 
In Japanese, hybrid words are common in kango (words formed from kanji characters) in which some of the characters may be pronounced using Chinese pronunciations (on'yomi, from Chinese morphemes), and others in the same word are pronounced using Japanese pronunciations (kun'yomi, from Japanese morphemes). These words are known as jūbako (重箱) or yutō (湯桶), which are themselves examples of this kind of compound (they are autological words): the first character of jūbako is read using on'yomi, the second kun'yomi, while it is the other way around with yutō. Other examples include 場所 basho "place" (kun-on), 金色 kin'iro "golden" (on-kun) and 合気道 aikidō "the martial art Aikido" (kun-on-on). Some hybrid words are neither jūbako nor yutō (縦中横 tatechūyoko (kun-on-kun)). Foreign words may also be hybridized with Chinese or Japanese readings in slang words such as 高層ビル kōsōbiru "high-rise building" (on-on-katakana) and 飯テロ meshitero "food terrorism" (kun-katakana).

See also 
 Classical compound
 International scientific vocabulary
 List of Greek and Latin roots in English
 Phono-semantic matching
 In Sino-Japanese vocabulary, hybrid words are called jūbako (重箱) or yutō (湯桶); see: Kanji § Other readings

Notes

English language
Etymology
Linguistic morphology
Word coinage
Macaronic language

de:Hybridbildung#Hybridbildung in der Wortbildung